The Adelaide United FC awards night is held annually and recognises the football club's best and fairest players as viewed by the club, the media, its coaches and its players.

Aurelio Vidmar Club Champion
The most prestigious award and highest accolade to be bestowed upon a player. The award goes to a player who has consistently made a significant and positive difference to the team’s performance during the games played, represented the club in an exemplary way, portrayed a totally professional attitude to everything he did on and off the park and personifies the vision of the club.

Player’s Player - A-League
Voted by his team mates to be consistently the most valuable player on the park, set standards on and off the park that all players in the team aspire to and best exemplify their ideal type of player.

Members' Player of the Year -A-League

Remo Paris Club Person
Awarded to the person who most epitomises the values and ideals of Adelaide United, on or off the pitch.

Rising Star - A-League
A young player voted by the coaches to have made a significant impact over the season, demonstrated the greatest growth in their development as a professional player and promises the greatest potential growth as a professional player.

Most Valuable Player – Youth
The player who consistently made a significant and positive difference to the team’s performance during the games played and portrayed a totally professional attitude.

Dianne Alagich Medal – W-League
The player who consistently made a significant and positive difference to the team’s performance during the games played and portrayed a totally professional attitude.

Rising Star - W-League

Player’s Player - W-League

Members' Player of the Year -W-League

References

External links
 Club website
 2008/09 award winners
 2009/10 award winners
 2010/11 award winners
 2011/12 award winners
 2012/13 award winners
 2013/14 award winners
 2014/15 award winners
 2015/16 award winners
 2016/17 award winners
 2017/18 award winners
 2021/22 award winners

Lists of award winners
Adelaide United FC